Marios Nicolaou  (Greek: Μάριος Νικολάου; born 26 July 1996) is a Cypriot footballer who plays for Cypriot First Division club Ayia Napa FC on loan from Anorthosis Famagusta. He plays as a defender.

Career
Ahead of the 2019-20 season, Nicolaou was loaned out to Ayia Napa FC from Anorthosis Famagusta.

References

External links
 CFA profile
 

1996 births
Living people
Cypriot footballers
Cyprus under-21 international footballers
Anorthosis Famagusta F.C. players
Anagennisi Deryneia FC players
Ayia Napa FC players
Cypriot First Division players
Cypriot Second Division players
Association football defenders